Twin Lakes is a pair of lakes approximately  southwest of the town of Bridgeport in Mono County, California. Mono Village and Twin Lakes resorts lie along the lakeside. The communities around the lake are part of the Twin Lakes census-designated place.

The lakes serve as the northern terminus of the Sierra High Route.

See also
 List of lakes in California

References

Lakes of Mono County, California